Cécile Gallez (16 May 1936 – 31 July 2022) was a French politician who was a member of the National Assembly of France.  She represented the Nord department as a member of the Union for a Popular Movement.

References

1936 births
2022 deaths
People from Nord (French department)
Members of Parliament for Nord
Union for a Popular Movement politicians
The Republicans (France) politicians
Women members of the National Assembly (France)
Deputies of the 12th National Assembly of the French Fifth Republic
Deputies of the 13th National Assembly of the French Fifth Republic
21st-century French women politicians
Chevaliers of the Légion d'honneur
Mayors of places in Hauts-de-France
Women mayors of places in France
French pharmacists